Marian College is an autonomous educational institution in Kuttikkanam(Idukki), Kerala, India. It offers graduate and postgraduate courses. The Catholic Diocese of Kanjirapally established Marian College Kuttikkanam in 1995 to provide the student community with education in information technology, commerce, social work and management. Marian College Kuttikkanam is accredited with 'A' Grade by NAAC. The college is declared as the College with Potential for Excellence (CPE) by UGC. Marian college is affiliated to MG University Kottayam. Marian acquired its autonomous status in 2016 becoming the youngest college to acquire the status in 21 years.

Courses
 MCA (AICTE Approved)
 MCom with PGDBA (Postgraduate Diploma In Business Administration)
 MCom (Aided)
 MSW 
 MMH (Master of Management in Hospitality)
 BBA with E-Commerce (Aided)
 B.com with Taxation (Aided)
 B.com with Taxation (Self-Financing)
 BSW (Self-Financing)
 BA Applied Economics (Self-Financing)
 BA Communicative English (Self-Financing)
 Bsc Mathematics (Self-Financing)
 Bsc Physics (self financing)
 BCA (Aided)
 MCMS - PG (Mass Communication and Media Studies)

Hostel facilities
 Separate hostel for Boys and Girls
 Five hostels functioning
 Toilet attached and non-attached rooms
 Furnished mess which can serve 700 persons at a time
 Indoor Floodlit Rubberised Badminton Court
Table Tennis Tables
Highly Equipped Laundry Services
 Gymnasium

Notable alumni
 Asif Ali - Malayalam Cine Actor
 Askar Ali - Malayalam Cine Actor
 George Thengummoottil - Documentary filmmaker / Film editor

External links
 Official website

References

Arts colleges in India
Catholic universities and colleges in India
Arts and Science colleges in Kerala
Colleges affiliated to Mahatma Gandhi University, Kerala
Universities and colleges in Idukki district
Educational institutions established in 1995
1995 establishments in Kerala